The Sin Hung-class torpedo boat is a class of torpedo boats in service with the Korean People's Navy.

Construction
The Sin Hung-class torpedo boats stopped being produced in 1983. The Korean People's Navy has at least 120 of them.

Specifications
They displace 25 t full load. The normal armament consists of two  torpedo tubes, although some ships carry  torpedo tubes instead, with a gun armament of two twin  machine guns.

Service history
During a naval drill off Nampo by the Korean People's Navy on October 5, 2016, five Sin Hung-class torpedo boats were part of the 80 some training fleet.

References

Sources

External links
Image

Torpedo boats of North Korea